Samuel Henry John Worthington (born 2 August 1976) is an English-born Australian actor. He moved from England when he was 6 months old, and he was raised in Australia. He is best known for playing Jake Sully in the Avatar franchise, Marcus Wright in Terminator Salvation, and Perseus in Clash of the Titans and its sequel Wrath of the Titans. He has taken other dramatic roles, appearing in The Debt (2010), Everest (2015), Hacksaw Ridge (2016), The Shack (2017), Manhunt: Unabomber (2017), and Fractured (2019).

On television, he appeared in his native Australia as Howard in Love My Way and as Phillip Schuler in the television drama mini-series Deadline Gallipoli, for which he was also an executive producer. He voiced the protagonist, Captain Alex Mason, in the video game Call of Duty: Black Ops (2010), as well as its sequels Call of Duty: Black Ops II (2012), and Call of Duty: Black Ops 4 (2018). 

In 2022, he starred in the true crime miniseries Under the Banner of Heaven.

In 2004, Worthington received Australia's highest film award for his lead role in Somersault.

Early life
Worthington was born to English parents in Godalming, Surrey, in South East England, UK. 

He moved to Perth, Western Australia, in youth. He grew up in Warnbro, a suburb of Rockingham. His mother, Jeanne J. (née Martyn), is a housewife, and his father, Ronald W. Worthington, is a power plant laborer. He has a sister, Lucinda.

He attended John Curtin College of the Arts, a school specialising in the dramatic arts, located in Fremantle, Western Australia, where he studied drama but did not graduate. When he left the college, his father gave him $400 and sent him on a one-way trip to Cairns, Queensland, telling him to "work his way home". He began working on construction and odd jobs, eventually settling in Sydney. At age 19, while working as a bricklayer, he auditioned for the National Institute of Dramatic Art and was accepted with a scholarship.

Career

2000–2003
Worthington played a small role alongside Adam Garcia in the Aussie dance film Bootmen (2000). He also played a lead role in the low-budget Aussie comedy Gettin' Square.

2004–2008
Worthington had a major role in Somersault (2004), for which he won the AFI Award for Best Lead Actor. He was well known in Australia for his role as Howard in the acclaimed Australian TV series  Love My Way, in which he played the main love interest of the female lead. In 2006, he played the lead in a modern Australian retelling of Macbeth.

Worthington's international film career began with a series of small roles in Hollywood production The Great Raid (2005), which was filmed in Australia.
He auditioned for the role of James Bond in Casino Royale, but lost the role to Daniel Craig. He starred in the Australian creature-feature film Rogue (2007), as a man named Neil, which gained a 100% fresh rating from Rotten Tomatoes.

2009–present

Worthington auditioned for James Cameron-directed science-fiction film Avatar, in which he played Jake Sully, a paraplegic former U.S. Marine who finds himself at the centre of a war between his own species and the indigenous Na'vi people of the moon Pandora. The film became the highest-grossing film of all time, grossing more than $2.8 billion ($ billion adjusted for inflation) in box-office receipts worldwide. In November 2010, Worthington told GQ Australia that he auditioned but was not told what it was for, which annoyed him. "I was a bit pissed off, and I think that came across. think Jim saw a spark and liked it because that's Sully's character – a guy who doesn't like to be bullied and a guy who just wants to set things right."

After auditioning with James Cameron, Worthington landed the part in 2009's Terminator Salvation of Marcus Wright, who assists humans despite their suspicions of him, thanks to the director’s friendship with fellow filmmaker McG.

He later said that James Cameron "changed his life" and he will always be grateful to him. 

He provided voice work for Captain Alex Mason, the protagonist in the video game Call of Duty: Black Ops. Some gamers criticised Worthington's inability to mask his Australian accent, as in Avatar. In November 2010, The Hollywood Reporter named Worthington as one of the young male actors who are "pushing – or being pushed" into taking over Hollywood as the new "A-List".

He was selected as one of the entrants to the Who's Who in Australia 2011 edition.

In 2012, Worthington starred in the sequel to Clash of the Titans, called Wrath of the Titans, alongside Liam Neeson. As in the first film, Worthington played the demigod and son of Zeus, Perseus. He also reprised his role as Alex Mason in Call of Duty: Black Ops II. Also in 2012, Worthington starred as Nick Cassidy in Man on a Ledge, a suspense-thriller film directed by Asger Leth. Though the film received poor reviews from critics, Worthington's performance received praise, with The New Zealand Herald describing him as "suitably terrified".

Worthington portrayed Jim Fitzgerald in the Discovery Channel television series, Manhunt: Unabomber.

In 2019, Worthington starred as Ray Monroe in the Netflix thriller film Fractured.

Personal life 

Worthington has reported that, when he was about 30, he sold most of his possessions, bought a car with the proceeds, and was living in it before he auditioned for Avatar.

On 18 October 2013, Worthington confirmed his relationship with model Lara (Bingle) Worthington. They married on 28 December 2014 and have three sons: Rocket Zot, born in 2015; Racer, in 2016; and River, in 2020.

Worthington is a Christian and recovering alcoholic. He says that he began drinking heavily as a means to cope with his loss of privacy following his increase in popularity after Avatar's release, and stopped after his wife Lara gave him an ultimatum. He has been sober since 2014.

Legal issues

On 23 February 2014, Worthington was arrested in New York City for assault, after punching a paparazzo, Sheng Li, who followed Bingle to get a "perfect picture". Video footage of the incident depicts Worthington referring to Bingle as his "wife", furthering speculation about the pair's marital status. Worthington was initially released on a desk appearance ticket, while Li was arrested on charges of reckless endangerment, assault, and harassment.

On 26 February 2014, Worthington appeared in Manhattan Criminal Court, where he was ordered to stay away from Li for six months. The case was adjourned until 8 May 2014, with the actor to face charges of assault in the third degree, attempted assault, and harassment.

On 1 April 2014, Li blamed Bingle for starting the fight and called for her to be arrested. Later that month, Worthington secured a conditional discharge deal on a misdemeanour assault charge, thereby avoiding any jail time, while the charges against Li were dismissed "in the interest of justice". Li then filed a $3.7 million civil lawsuit against Worthington, which was settled out of court before going to trial in September 2015.

Filmography

Film

Television

Video games

Awards and nominations

References

External links 

 

1976 births
Living people
Australian Christians
Australian expatriates in England
Australian male film actors
Australian male television actors
Australian male video game actors
Australian male voice actors
English male film actors
English male television actors
English male video game actors
English male voice actors
Best Actor AACTA Award winners
English emigrants to Australia
Male actors from Perth, Western Australia
Male actors from Surrey
Male motion capture actors
National Institute of Dramatic Art alumni
Naturalised citizens of Australia
People educated at John Curtin College of the Arts
People from Godalming
20th-century Australian male actors
21st-century Australian male actors